Elizabeth Ann Crowther (born 9 December 1954) is an English theatre actress. Her father was the actor, comedian and presenter Leslie Crowther and her mother was Jean Crowther, actress and dancer.

Theatre work

Beginning her stage career in 1966, Crowther debuted with London Festival Ballet (now English National Ballet), playing Clara, the lead role in the annual production of The Nutcracker. At the time, she was training at Arts Educational Schools, London, where she studied from ages 10–17. She later went on to train at École Jacques Lecoq, Paris, where she focused primarily on mime and physical theatre.

Since then, Crowther has featured in over a hundred theatre productions, touring in England as well as performing internationally.

Among Crowther's later theatre work are productions of A Passage to India (Simple8 Theatre/Theatre Royal, Northampton/ Park Theatre), Running Wild (Chichester/ Regents Park Theatre, UK tour), Oliver Twist (Regents Park) and Kite (Wrong Crowd/Soho Theatre) as part of the London International Mime Festival.

Working with the Royal Shakespeare Company (RSC) in Stratford, Crowther was cast in productions of Middleton and Dekker's The Roaring Girl, John Webster's The White Devil, Massinger's The City Madam, and Weiss' the Marat/Sade, a 'reimagined' version of Cardenio (Shakespeare's lost play) by Gregory Doran, Song of Songs (adapted from the biblical text) and The Witch of Edmonton by Dekker and Ford.

Crowther played the title role in Richard III, performing the show and conducting workshops on tour across the US, with 'Actors from the London Stage'. She has also performed in Romeo and Juliet (Rose Theatre, Bankside, and Globe Theatre), Macbeth (Theatre Royal, Northampton), Twelfth Night and The Merry Wives of Windsor (Regents Park).

Appearing in over twenty-five plays for the same theatre, Crowther's credits at the Orange Tree Theatre, Richmond, include Middlemarch Trilogy, The Memorandum, Bodies, What the Heart Feels, Four Attempted Acts and King Lear.

Elsewhere, Crowther has appeared in Cyrano de Bergerac (Royal Exchange), Blithe Spirit (Nottingham Playhouse), Mr Whatnot, The Elephant Man, Piaf, Wait Until Dark and David Copperfield (Theatre Royal, Northampton), Abigail’s Party (Hampstead Theatre & UK Tour), Communicating Doors (Stephen Joseph and Chicago Theatre Festival), The Real Thing (UK Tour), and Be My Baby and Pat and Margaret (Salisbury Playhouse).

Crowther's noteworthy appearances in London's West End include The Country Wife (Theatre Royal Haymarket), Gambling (Royal Court), Onassis (Novello Theatre), Animal Farm (National Theatre) and Ducktastic (Noël Coward Theatre), written by comedy double-act The Right Size and directed by Kenneth Branagh.

Television and film work
Although primarily a stage performer, Crowther has also made film and television appearances. She first appeared as Lucy in ABC's 1967 production of The Lion, The Witch and the Wardrobe. Later, she featured in Shoestring, Watching, Slinger's Day, French Fields, The Dumping Ground, Outnumbered, Mansfield Park, Holby City, London’s Burning, Miss Marple, EastEnders and A Very Peculiar Practice. Beyond these appearances, Crowther was a regular cast member in soap opera Family Affairs, playing Annie Hart, from its debut in 1997, until 1999. She also played Sgt Jane Kendall in The Bill for nine months in 1993. In May 2020, she appeared in an episode of the BBC soap opera Doctors as Jenny Morgan. She played Nerissa Norris in "All that Glisters", an episode of Shakespeare & Hathaway: Private Investigators (September 2020).

In film, Crowther has played Romola Garai's mother in The Unicorn (Daybreak Pictures), a short film by Penelope Skinner. She has also featured in Funseekers (Comic Strip) and The Thirty-Nine Steps (Rank).

Charity work
Crowther works with Scene & Heard, a playwriting charity committed to benefiting disadvantaged children in Somers Town, Kings Cross, London, performing alongside other volunteer theatre professionals.

References

1954 births
Living people
English television actresses
English soap opera actresses
People from Isleworth
20th-century English actresses
21st-century English actresses
Actresses from London
English child actresses
English film actresses
English stage actresses